Mesa Vista (corruption of Vista de la Mesa, Spanish for "View of Table") is a census-designated place (CDP) in Alpine County, California, United States. The population was 200 at the 2010 census, up from 182 at the 2000 census.

Geography

Demographics

2010
The 2010 United States Census reported that Mesa Vista had a population of 200. The racial makeup of Mesa Vista was 178 (89.0%) White, 0 (0.0%) African American, 15 (7.5%) Native American, 2 (1.0%) Asian, 0 (0.0%) Pacific Islander, 0 (0.0%) from other races, and 5 (2.5%) from two or more races. Hispanic or Latino of any race were 11 persons (5.5%).

The Census reported that 200 people (100% of the population) lived in households, 0 (0%) lived in non-institutionalized group quarters, and 0 (0%) were institutionalized.

There were 83 households, out of which 21 (25.3%) had children under the age of 18 living in them, 56 (67.5%) were opposite-sex married couples living together, 5 (6.0%) had a female householder with no husband present, 1 (1.2%) had a male householder with no wife present.  There were 9 (10.8%) unmarried opposite-sex partnerships, and 0 (0%) same-sex married couples or partnerships. 12 households (14.5%) were made up of individuals, and 3 (3.6%) had someone living alone who was 65 years of age or older. The average household size was 2.41.  There were 62 families (74.7% of all households); the average family size was 2.68.

The population was spread out, with 40 people (20.0%) under the age of 18, 4 people (2.0%) aged 18 to 24, 33 people (16.5%) aged 25 to 44, 87 people (43.5%) aged 45 to 64, and 36 people (18.0%) who were 65 years of age or older.  The median age was 50.8 years. For every 100 females, there were 94.2 males.  For every 100 females age 18 and over, there were 107.8 males.

There were 103 housing units at an average density of 21.1 per square mile (8.2/km), of which 83 were occupied, of which 73 (88.0%) were owner-occupied, and 10 (12.0%) were occupied by renters. The homeowner vacancy rate was 1.3%; the rental vacancy rate was 28.6%.  176 people (88.0% of the population) lived in owner-occupied housing units and 24 people (12.0%) lived in rental housing units.

2000
As of the census of 2000, there were 182 people, 72 households, and 49 families residing in the CDP.  The population density was 10.7 people per square mile (4.1/km).  There were 85 housing units at an average density of 5.0 per square mile (1.9/km).  The racial makeup of the CDP was 87.36% White, 3.30% Black or African American, 6.04% Native American, 0.55% from other races, and 2.75% from two or more races.  4.40% of the population were Hispanic or Latino of any race.

There were 72 households, out of which 30.6% had children under the age of 18 living with them, 58.3% were married couples living together, 8.3% had a female householder with no husband present, and 30.6% were non-families. 23.6% of all households were made up of individuals, and 2.8% had someone living alone who was 65 years of age or older.  The average household size was 2.53 and the average family size was 2.98.

In the CDP, the population was spread out, with 23.6% under the age of 18, 3.8% from 18 to 24, 25.8% from 25 to 44, 36.3% from 45 to 64, and 10.4% who were 65 years of age or older.  The median age was 44 years. For every 100 females, there were 97.8 males.  For every 100 females age 18 and over, there were 101.4 males.

The median income for a household in the CDP was $55,781, and the median income for a family was $65,250. Males had a median income of $33,750 versus $25,625 for females. The per capita income for the CDP was $21,906.  None of the families and 1.7% of the population were living below the poverty line, including no under eighteens and 6.3% of those over 64.

References

Census-designated places in Alpine County, California
Census-designated places in California